Gençosman (1621–1638) was a Turkish hero who distinguished himself during the Capture of Baghdad (1638). He was born in 1621. Although he was too young to join the army during Murat IV's campaign, he secretly joined the army and was the first soldier to plant the Ottoman flag to the bastion of the fort. But soon he fell. His remains were buried in his home village which was Dorikini. In 1960s the name of the village was changed to Gençosman to commemorate him.

References

1621 births
1638 deaths
Ottoman people of the Ottoman–Persian Wars
People from Gençosman, Bayburt